Kenneth Yeo Wi Jin (born 2 February 1974) is a Singaporean former freestyle swimmer. He competed in four events at the 1992 Summer Olympics.

References

External links
 

1974 births
Living people
Singaporean male freestyle swimmers
Olympic swimmers of Singapore
Swimmers at the 1992 Summer Olympics
Place of birth missing (living people)
Asian Games medalists in swimming
Swimmers at the 1990 Asian Games
Asian Games bronze medalists for Singapore
Medalists at the 1990 Asian Games
20th-century Singaporean people